Rufforth Circuit is a disused motor racing circuit built on an airfield in North Yorkshire, England. Rufforth circuit was built on the site of a World War II bomber base, RAF Rufforth, opened in 1942. The airfield remained in active service after the war, eventually closing in 1954. Rufforth circuit opened in 1959, and held races until 1962. The circuit hosted Formula 2 and Formula Junior races between 1961-1978 as well as numerous sports car events. The circuit was one of many of Britain's airfields to be transformed into motor racing venues.

History 
The original track layout of Rufforth circuit was used in 1959.

The layout of Rufforth circuit was changed for 1960. The start/finish straight was moved from the main straight to between Fosse Curve and Grange Curve.

Results

References

Bibliography
Peter Swinger (2001). Motor Racing Circuits In England Then And Now. .

Defunct sports venues in North Yorkshire
Defunct motorsport venues in England
Rufforth